Jent is the surname of the following people
Chris Jent (born 1970), American basketball coach and former player
Franz Louis Jent, founder of the German-language newspaper Der Bund
Larry Jent, American politician

See also
Gent

English-language surnames